The Wujiangdu Dam is an arch-gravity dam on the Wu River south of Zunyi, Guizhou Province, China. The purpose of the dam is hydroelectric power generation, flood control and navigation. The dam's power stations contain five generators for a total installed capacity of 1,130 MW.

Construction
Construction on the dam began in 1970, the first generator was operational in 1979 and the remaining original two in 1983. Two additional 250 MW generators were installed and operational between 2003 and 2004 and the three original 210 MW were upgraded in 2011 to 250 MW units.

Design
The dam has six spillways, two of which flank the power house and are ski-jump chute type while the other four are chutes as well and over-top the power house. The dam also has two flood discharge tunnels on each of its banks as well. The dam's power station sits at its middle base and contains the original 3 x 210 MW generators. The two additional 250 MW generators were installed in another power plant.

See also 

 List of power stations in China

References

Hydroelectric power stations in Guizhou
Dams in China
Arch-gravity dams
Dams completed in 1982
Dams on the Wu River
Energy infrastructure completed in 1979
1982 establishments in China